Krampenes is a village in Vadsø Municipality in Troms og Finnmark county, Norway. It is located on the northern shore of the Varangerfjorden on the eastern shore of the Varanger Peninsula.

The majority of the village population is Norwegian as well as some Sami residents.  The Sami  reindeer herders on the Varanger Peninsula bring their reindeer to the slaughtering facilities in Krampenes each year, and they recruit their labour force for the slaughtering plant from the Norwegians in Krampenes.

References

Vadsø
Villages in Finnmark
Populated places of Arctic Norway